Emily Naphtal (born April 20, 1989, in Skokie, Illinois, United States) is an American lawyer and figure skater who competed internationally for Mexico. She was the 2006 Mexican national silver medalist and multiple time Junior World and Four Continents competitor. She was coached by Suna Murray. She graduated from Weston High School, Weston, Massachusetts, in 2007, from Harvard University in 2011, and from New York University School of Law in 2015. In 2017, she started the New York-based law firm Stephens Naphtal Law PLLC, which "advocates for diverse peoples' rights to contribute their talents to [] society."

Results

External links

References

Mexican female single skaters
1989 births
Living people
People from Skokie, Illinois
Harvard University alumni
New York University School of Law alumni
American sportswomen
People from Weston, Massachusetts
American lawyers
Weston High School (Massachusetts) alumni
Sportspeople from Middlesex County, Massachusetts
Sportspeople from Cook County, Illinois
21st-century American women